The Diana-Trial is a Group 3 flat horse race in Germany open to three-year-old thoroughbred fillies. It is run over a distance of 2,000 metres (about 1¼ miles) at Hoppegarten in May or June. The race downgrade to Group 3 in 2022

History
The event serves as a trial for the Preis der Diana. It was formerly named after the joint winners of that race in 1984, Las Vegas and Slenderella. It was originally contested at Mülheim over 2,100 or 2,200 metres.

For a period the Las Vegas-Slenderella-Rennen was classed at Listed level. It became known as the Diana-Trial in the late 1990s. It was given Group 3 status in 2004, and from this point it was run at Cologne as the Schwarzgold-Rennen. It was promoted to Group 2 in 2006.

The race reverted to the title Diana-Trial in 2008. It was transferred to Hoppegarten with a new distance of 2,000 metres in 2009.

The last winner of the race to achieve victory in the Preis der Diana was Iota in 2005.

Records
Leading jockey (6 wins):
 Andrasch Starke – Night Petticoat (1996), Borgia (1997), Flamingo Road (1999), Lilac Queen (2001), Miss Europa (2009), Nightflower (2015)

Leading trainer (5 wins):

 Peter Schiergen - Alpha City (1995), Iota (2005), Miss Europa (2009), Longina (2014), Nightflower (2015)

Winners

 Monami was disqualified after winning in 2012, but the original result was restored after an appeal.

See also

 List of German flat horse races

References

 Racing Post:

 galopp-sieger.de – Las Vegas-Slenderella-Rennen.
 galopp-sieger.de – Schwarzgold-Rennen (ex Diana-Trial).
 horseracingintfed.com – International Federation of Horseracing Authorities – Diana-Trial (2016).
 pedigreequery.com – Las Vegas-Slenderella-Rennen.

Flat horse races for three-year-old fillies
Sport in Brandenburg
Horse races in Germany